Debhata is a union parishad situated at the southwest part of Debhata Upazila, Satkhira District, Khulna Division of Bangladesh.

References

Unions of Debhata Upazila
Unions of Satkhira District